T. J. Jacob is a police officer from Kerala, India, of the Central Reserve Police Force. He was a swimmer and retired as Deputy Inspector General.

Education 
He completed his bachelor's degree from St. Thomas College, Palai. He was a swimmer and water polo player representing the University at the National level. In 1977 and 1978 he was the All India university Champion for Swimming.

Swimming career 
After joining the CRPF he was adjudged the best swimmer at the 18th Inter-Range Aquatic Meet. He also participated in the Second Asian Swimming Championship held at Seoul, Korea in 1984. He also won medals for swimming at the All India Police Aquatic meet held in 1984. He represented India at the South Asian Games at Kathmandu in 1984, winning the 200m butterfly stroke, silver medal.
He was awarded the G. V. Raja award for swimming for 1979–80.

Career 
He was recruited in 1979 by the CRPF while still a student at St. Thomas College. He served almost 12 years representing CRPF and India in national and international aquatic meets, after which he was deputed to the SPG. 
In 2007, as a part of his second tenure with the SPG, he was part of the security detail for the Gandhi Family.
He served as the principal of the CRPF's recruit training center in Peringome till June 2016. He was later appointed DIGP CRPF, at the Muzzafarpur Group Center.
Towards the end of his career, he served his last 3 years with the CRPF as DIG Srinagar Sector.

Awards 
In, 1999 while serving as AIG attached to the Special Protection Group he was awarded the Police Medal and in 2008 during his second tenure with the SPG, he was awarded the President's Police Medal.

Retirement 
He retired from active service on 31 May 2020. He works as a coach with Thoppans Swimming Academy in Pala, which is run by him along with his brothers.

References 

1957 births
Living people
Indian police officers
People from Pala, Kerala
Swimmers from Kerala